Nueva Ecija's at-large congressional district was the provincewide electoral district of Nueva Ecija for Philippine national legislatures before 1987.

The district was first created ahead of the 1898 Philippine legislative election for two seats in the Malolos Congress. Epifanio de los Santos and José Turiano Santiago were elected at-large as Nueva Ecija's representatives in the National Assembly of the nascent First Philippine Republic, with a third seat allocated for an appointed delegate from Pampanga, Gregorio Macapinlac. After the fall of the Republic, the U.S. insular government was installed which reorganized a legislative assembly for representatives of the different provinces in 1907, the Philippine Assembly. Nueva Ecija was given one seat in that legislature and continued to elect its representatives from this single-member at-large district until the 1926 reapportionment into two smaller districts which took effect beginning with the 1928 Philippine House of Representatives elections.

Nueva Ecija returned to at-large elections for a seat in the National Assembly of the Second Philippine Republic in 1943. The restoration of the Commonwealth government and the House of Representatives in 1945 also restored the two districts in the province thereby eliminating the provincewide electoral district. It was recreated for the last time ahead of the 1984 Philippine parliamentary election following a shift from regional electoral districts in the interim parliament, where Nueva Ecija was included in the multi-member at-large representation of Region III (Central Luzon) from 1978 to 1984, to provincial and city district constituencies in the regular parliament.

The district became obsolete following the 1987 reapportionment that established four districts in the province under a new constitution.

Representation history

See also
Legislative districts of Nueva Ecija

References

Former congressional districts of the Philippines
Politics of Nueva Ecija
1898 establishments in the Philippines
1901 disestablishments in the Philippines
1907 establishments in the Philippines
1928 disestablishments in the Philippines
1943 establishments in the Philippines
1944 disestablishments in the Philippines
1984 establishments in the Philippines
1986 disestablishments in the Philippines
At-large congressional districts of the Philippines
Congressional districts of Central Luzon
Constituencies established in 1898
Constituencies established in 1943
Constituencies established in 1984
Constituencies disestablished in 1986
Constituencies disestablished in 1944